Say You Will is the seventeenth studio album by British-American rock band Fleetwood Mac, released on 15 April 2003. It followed 1995's Time and was their first album since 1970 without vocalist/keyboardist Christine McVie as a full member following her departure in 1998, though she participated in some songs as a guest musician; it would be her last time being involved with the band in a studio capacity before her death in 2022. Lindsey Buckingham and Stevie Nicks shared primary keyboard duties throughout the album.

This was the band's last full album with Buckingham before his dismissal from the group in 2018, although he later participated in their 2013 extended play.

Say You Will was the first studio Fleetwood Mac album to peak in the top three in the US since 1982's Mirage.  The album debuted at No. 3 with sales of 218,000, spent two months within the top 40, and was certified Gold by the RIAA in July 2003 for 500,000 copies shipped in the US.

A limited edition version of the album was issued at the same time, featuring two live tracks ("Peacekeeper" and "Say You Will"), two additional studio tracks (Nicks' "Not Make Believe" and Buckingham's cover of Bob Dylan's "Love Minus Zero/No Limit"), an expanded booklet and poster.

Background
Soon after the release of Time, Billy Burnette and Bekka Bramlett departed to form the country duo Bekka & Billy. Rather than continuing, Fleetwood Mac chose to disband. By 1997, the Rumours lineup agreed to perform again for an MTV Unplugged special. Following the successful reunion album, The Dance, which included a live performance of "Bleed to Love Her", Christine McVie left the group, citing her fear of flying as the primary reason for her departure.

In the early 2000s, Buckingham was finishing up a solo album but got a call from Warner Bros to work on a Fleetwood Mac record instead. Buckingham agreed and set aside a large portion of his songs for Say You Will, with Mick Fleetwood and John McVie on drums and bass, respectively. To round out the album, Nicks brought in some new material, along with leftovers from previous albums. One of those songs, "Smile at You", dates back to the Tusk sessions in 1979 but was never recorded by the full band until Say You Will.

Track listing

Note
"Bleed to Love Her" was previously available on The Dance as a live version.

Personnel
Fleetwood Mac
 Lindsey Buckingham – vocals, guitars, keyboards, bass guitar, percussion, programming
 Stevie Nicks – vocals, additional keyboards
 John McVie – bass guitar, black keys
 Mick Fleetwood – drums, percussion

Additional musicians
 John Shanks – additional keyboards (1), additional guitars (8)
 Sheryl Crow – Hammond organ and backing vocals (7, 12)
 Jamie Muhoberac – Hammond organ (9)
 Christine McVie – Hammond organ, keyboards (13), backing vocals (13, 14)
 Dave Palmer – acoustic  piano (13)
 John Pierce – bass guitar [verses] (13)
 Madelyne Felsch, Molly McVie and Jessica James Nicks – backing vocals (7)

Production
 Lindsey Buckingham – producer, engineer 
 Rob Cavallo – producer (5, 6, 9, 13, 14), A&R 
 John Shanks – producer (1, 8)
 Ken Allardyce – engineer 
 Ken Koroshetz – engineer 
 Ray Lindsey – engineer, band technician 
 Mark Needham – engineer, mixing (1-15, 17, 18)
 Chris Lord-Alge – mixing (16)
 Bernie Grundman – mastering 
 Joe Bozzi – mastering assistant 
 Mike Fasano – band technician 
 Bruce Jaccoby – band technician 
 Garner Knutsen – band technician 
 Mike Zablow – band technician 
 Stephen Walker – art direction 
 Keith Carter – "Hands 1991" photography 
 Karen Johnston – photography 
 Neal Preston – photography 
 Herbert W. Worthington – photography 

Studios
 Recorded at The Bellagio House; Ocean Way Recording (Hollywood, California); Lindsey's garage (Los Angeles, California); Cornerstone Studios (Chatsworth, California).
 Mixed at Cornerstone Studios; Conway Studios (Hollywood, California); Image Recording Studios (Los Angeles, California).
 Mastered at Bernie Grundman Mastering (Hollywood, California).

Management
 Tony Dimitriades and Robert Richards at East End Management – management for Lindsey Buckingham
 Howard Kaufman and Sheryl Lewis at HK Management – management for Stevie Nicks
 Carl Stubner at Immortal Management – management for Mick Fleetwood

Charts

Weekly charts

Year-end charts

Certifications

Music promo videos
Music videos were shot for "Peacekeeper" and "Say You Will", both of these videos were stage performances of both songs. Neither of these videos are commercially available.

References

Fleetwood Mac albums
2003 albums
Albums produced by John Shanks
Albums produced by Lindsey Buckingham
Albums produced by Rob Cavallo
Reprise Records albums
Albums recorded at United Western Recorders